is a volcanic desert island located in the Philippine Sea approximately  south off the coast of Tokyo, at the southernmost tip of the Izu archipelago, Japan. Though only 0.01 km2 in area, it reaches almost 100 meters in height.

Geography
The sides of the island features several geological joints facing the water's surface.

Due to its shape and heavy seas, it is almost impossible to disembark on the island, although attempts have been made by rock climbers successfully in 1972 and 2003 (though several accidents have been registered). A scientific expedition visited the island in 2017 along with an NHK film crew. The expedition was featured in an episode of the documentary series NHK Documentary, which aired in February 2019.

The site is also known for the transparency of its surrounding waters and abundance of fish, which makes it a popular scuba diving spot.

The only vegetation on the island is a few clumps of Poaceae, and the island attracts a small number of seabirds for nesting.

History
On April 9, 1788, British merchant sailor John Meares sighted what he came to describe as “the most marvellous thing” he had ever set his eyes on, a small island he and the ship’s crew decided to baptize as Lot's Wife, referring to the Book of Genesis 19:26. The Japanese name Sōfu Iwa (“The Widow Crag”) is rather freely translated from English.

During the Pacific War, Sofu Gan was used by US Navy submariners as a reference marker for calibration of instruments as they entered Japanese waters. The uninhabited and uninhabitable island was the southernmost Japanese island not occupied by the United States after the 1952 San Francisco Treaty. It is currently administratively part of Tokyo Metropolis.

See also

 Ball's Pyramid
 Rockall
 Shag Rocks (South Georgia)
 Black Rock, South Georgia
 Desert island
 List of islands
 List of islands in Japan

References

External links

Sofugan: Japan Coast Guard submarine volcano database 
  - Japan Meteorological Agency

Izu Islands
Uninhabited islands of Japan
Extinct volcanoes
Stacks of Japan
Islands of Tokyo
Lot (biblical person)